is a 1986 Japanese film directed by Kazuki Ōmori.

Awards
11th Japan Academy Prize
Nominated: Best Director - Kazuki Ōmori
Nominated: Best Screenwriter - Kazuki Ōmori
Nominated: Best Actress - Yuki Saito

References

1986 films
Films based on Japanese novels
Films directed by Kazuki Ōmori
1980s Japanese films